Korea(n) Bay, sometimes West Korea(n) Bay (or ), is a bight and the northern extension of the Yellow Sea, between the southeastern coastline of China's Liaoning Province and the western coastline of North Korea's North Pyongan, South Pyongan and South Hwanghae provinces.  It is separated from the Bohai Sea by the Liaodong Peninsula, with Dalian's Lüshunkou District marking its western end, and westernmost tip of North Korea's Ryongyon County as its eastern end.

The Yalu (Amnok) River, which marks the western two-thirds of the China–North Korea border, empties into the Korea Bay between Dandong (China) and Sinŭiju (North Korea). The Chongchon River and Taedong River also drains into the Korea Bay at Sinanju and Nampo, respectively.

References

External links 
 

Geography of China
Geography of North Korea